Now's the Time is an album by saxophonist Houston Person recorded in 1989 and released on the Muse label.

Reception

The AllMusic review by Ron Wynn called it a "Good soul jazz and blues session".

Track listing 
 "Love Me Tender" (Elvis Presley, Vera Matson) – 9:59
 "Blue Velvet" (Bernie Wayne, Lee Morris) – 6:06	
 "Blues for H.P." (Randy Johnston) – 7:17
 "Ceora" (Lee Morgan) – 5:32
 "Impossible" (Steve Allen) – 6:00
 "The Party's Over" (Jule Styne, Betty Comden, Adolph Green) – 8:26	
 "True Blues" (Joey DeFrancesco, Houston Person) – 9:58

Personnel 
Houston Person - tenor saxophone 
Joey DeFrancesco - organ
Randy Johnston - guitar
Bertell Knox – drums
Sammy Figueroa - congas, percussion

References 

Houston Person albums
1991 albums
Muse Records albums
Albums recorded at Van Gelder Studio